Mermessus maculatus is a species of dwarf spider in the family Linyphiidae. It is found in Russia (Commander )Is.) and a range from Canada to Guatemala.

References

Linyphiidae
Articles created by Qbugbot
Spiders described in 1892